Qeshlaq (also Romanized as Qeshlāq) is a village in Sarajuy-ye Gharbi Rural District, in the Central District of Maragheh County, East Azerbaijan Province, Iran. At the 2006 census, its population was 409, in 106 families.

References 

Towns and villages in Maragheh County